What's Love Got to Do with It is the eighth solo studio album by American singer Tina Turner, released on June 15, 1993, by Parlophone. It served as the soundtrack album for the 1993 Tina Turner biographical film of the same name, which was released by Touchstone Pictures that same year.

Overview
Turner re-recorded many of her songs from the Ike & Tina Turner period for this album including their first successful single, "A Fool in Love". Three brand-new tracks were also included, "I Don't Wanna Fight" being a top-10 entry in both the US and UK, her last major American chart success. The album also includes Turner's version of The Trammps' disco classic "Disco Inferno", a song she had often performed live in concert during the late 1970s, but which she had never previously recorded in studio. Two tracks from her 1984 breakthrough solo album Private Dancer are included as well, the title track to the movie and "I Might Have Been Queen". The album hit #1 on the UK Albums Chart and was certified platinum in various countries including the US, the UK, Switzerland and New Zealand.

The US version of the album omits two tracks; "Shake a Tail Feather" and "Tina's Wish". Turner's version of "You Know I Love You" was not the B.B. King song but a slightly different, more blues rock song Tina wrote herself with her bandmates though she still credited the song to King on the soundtrack. Tina recalls singing the B.B. King ballad in her 1986 memoir, I, Tina.

Track listings

Personnel 

 Tina Turner – lead vocals, backing vocals (1, 12)
 Steve DuBerry – keyboards (1), drum programming (1), backing vocals (1)
 C.J. Vanston – keyboards (1, 2, 3, 5-9, 11, 14), drum programming (1, 5), strings (4)
 David Paich – acoustic piano (4)
 Robbie King – Hammond B3 organ (4)
 Steve McNamara – programming (4)
 Rupert Hine – keyboards (12), bass (12), percussion programming (12), backing vocals (12)
 Nick Glennie-Smith – keyboards (13)
 Billy Livsey – keyboards (13)
 Gene Black – guitars (1, 3, 5-9, 11, 14), lead guitar (2)
 James Ralston – guitars (1, 2, 3, 5-11, 14), backing vocals (3)
 Keith Scott – guitars (4)
 Tim Pierce – guitar solo (5)
 Jamie West-Oram – guitars (12)
 Terry Britten – guitars (13), backing vocals (13)
 Bob Feit – bass (2, 3, 6-11, 14)
 Curt Bisquera – drums (1, 2, 3, 5-11, 14)
 Trevor Morais – drums (12)
 Graham Jarvis – drums (13)
 Simon Morton – percussion (13)
 Tim Cappello – saxophone (1, 2, 3, 6-9, 11, 14), backing vocals (1, 3), horn arrangements (5), bass vocals (8), featured vocals (10)
 Lee Thornburg – trombone (1, 3, 6, 8, 11, 14), trumpet (1, 3, 6, 8, 11, 14)
 Rick Braun – trumpet solo (4)
 Aaron Zigman – string arrangements (1, 5)
 Sharon Brown – backing vocals (2, 3, 6, 9, 10, 11, 14)
 Jackie Gouche – backing vocals (2, 3, 6, 9, 10, 11, 14)
 Jean McClain – backing vocals (2, 3, 6, 9, 10, 11, 14)
 The Tuck Back Twins (Bryan Adams and Mutt Lange) – backing vocals (4)
 Laurence Fishburne – spoken vocals (8, 10)
 Cy Curnin – backing vocals (12)
 Tessa Niles – backing vocals (13)

Production 
 Roger Davies – executive producer, management, producer (1, 2, 3, 5-11, 14)
 Tina Turner – executive producer, liner notes, producer (2, 3, 5-11, 14)
 Chris Lord-Alge – producer (1, 2, 3, 5-11, 14), engineer (1, 2, 3, 5-11, 14), mixing (1-11, 14), remixing (12)
 Steve DuBerry – additional producer (1)
 Bryan Adams – producer (4)
 Robert John "Mutt" Lange – producer (4)
 Rupert Hine – producer (12)
 Terry Britten – producer (13)
 Steve McNamara – engineer (4)
 Ron Obvious – engineer (4)
 John Hudson – engineer (12), mixing (12)
 Bill Leonard – assistant engineer (1, 2, 3, 5-11, 14)
 Talley Sherwood – assistant engineer (1-11, 14)
 Ben Wallach – assistant engineer (1-11, 14)
 Doug Sax – mastering
 Norman Moore – art direction, design 
 Peter Lindbergh – photography 
 Herb Ritts – photography

Studios
 Recorded at Record Plant (Los Angeles, California); Battery Studios and Mayfair Studios (London, UK); Farmyard Studios (Buckinghamshire, England); The Warehouse Studio (Vancouver, British Columbia, Canada).
 Overdubbed and Mixed at Image Recording Studios (Los Angeles, California).
 Mastered at The Mastering Lab (Hollywood, California).

Charts

Weekly charts

Year-end charts

Certifications

References

1993 soundtrack albums
Biographical film soundtracks
Contemporary R&B soundtracks
Parlophone soundtracks
Tina Turner soundtracks